Charlie Smith (died October 5, 1979) was a centenarian noted for claiming to be the oldest person in the United States at the time of his death on October 5, 1979.

History
Smith stated that he had been born in Liberia in 1842, kidnapped to the United States at age 12 and sold into slavery in Louisiana to a Texas rancher. Later research indicated that he had been born circa 1874 or even later. In particular, his marriage certificate, issued January 8, 1910, listed him as being 35 years old at the time. He died in Bartow, Florida on October 5, 1979, at the age of 105 (according to researchers) or 137 (according to his own claim). Later subsequent research showed Mr. Smith listed in the 1900 census as 21, suggesting he could have been only 100 years old. It is possible that he was given the birth name Mitchell Watkins and adopted at an early age in the years right after the Civil War with his "memories" embellishments from stories told by older ex-slaves, but evidence of this is spotty and it is unlikely that such an adoption would be verifiable, with records quite unreliable right after the Civil War.

Smith became a minor celebrity in Central Florida after news articles were published about his alleged longevity. He was invited to view the launch of Apollo 17 in 1972 from the VIP area at the Kennedy Space Center. He amused reporters with his skeptical comments, asserting that "th' ain't nobody goin' t' no moon. Me, you, or anybody else" and, after the launch, "I see they goin' somewhere, but that don't mean nothin'."

In popular media
The first film, "Charlie Smith at 131" (30 minutes) was made 1973 and directed by Michael Rabiger for the BBC "Yesterday's Witness" series.

Smith's falsified "life story" (which he took great delight in relating to interviewers, visitors, or basically anyone who would listen) was dramatized on film in 1978 in a 90-minute episode of the PBS television series Visions titled "Charlie Smith and the Fritter Tree." In the story, Smith comes to America in 1854 on the promise that there are "fritter trees" there. Tricked into slavery, he later escapes, joins the Union army and, after the war, heads out west where he chases Billy the Kid and rides with Jesse James.

See also
List of the last surviving American enslaved people

References

External links

 http://memory.loc.gov/ammem/collections/voices/vfssp.html#CharlieSmith.html
 http://www.trivia-library.com/b/biography-of-centenarian-charlie-smith.htm
 "Secret of Long Life", Time, July 14, 1967

19th-century births
1979 deaths
American centenarians
Men centenarians
Longevity myths